Ísak Tómasson (born 7 May 1964) is an Icelandic former basketball player and coach.

Playing career
Ísak started his senior team career in 1981 and played for Njarðvík his entire career where he won the national championship eight times and the Icelandic Basketball Cup five times. He retired following Njarðvík's championship win in 1995.

Coaching career
Ísak led Njarðvík women's team to victory in the second-tier 1. deild kvenna and achieve promotion to the top-tier Úrvalsdeild kvenna. He resigned from his post the following season after a 1–9 start.

National team career
Ísak played 3 games for the Icelandic national team in 1986.

References

External links
Úrvalsdeild statistics at Icelandic Basketball Association

1964 births
Living people
Ísak Tómasson
Ísak Tómasson
Ísak Tómasson
Ísak Tómasson
Ísak Tómasson
Ísak Tómasson